The 1977 Custom Credit Australian Indoor Championships was a men's tennis tournament played on indoor hard courts at the Hordern Pavilion in Sydney in Australia and was part of the 1977 Colgate-Palmolive Grand Prix. The tournament was held from 17 October through 23 October 1977. First-seeded Jimmy Connors won the singles title.

Finals

Singles

 Jimmy Connors defeated  Ken Rosewall 7–5, 6–4, 6–2
 It was Connors' 6th singles title of the year and the 59th of his career.

Doubles

 John Newcombe /  Tony Roche defeated  Ross Case /  Geoff Masters 6–7, 6–3, 6–1
 It was Newcombe's only title of the year and the 64th of his career. It was Roche's 2nd title of the year and the 25th of his career.

References

External links
 ITF tournament edition details

 
Custom Credit Australian Indoor Championships
Australian Indoor Tennis Championships
In
Custom Credit Australian Indoor Championships
Sports competitions in Sydney
Tennis in New South Wales